Nurabad (also Romanized as Nūrābād) is a village in Akhtarabad Rural District, in the Central District of Malard County, Tehran Province, Iran. At the 2006 census, its population was 33, in 8 families.

References 

Populated places in Malard County